Luni Assembly constituency is one of constituencies of Rajasthan Legislative Assembly in the Jodhpur (Lok Sabha constituency). Senior Congress leader Ram Singh Bishnoi used contest election from this seat.

List of members

References

See also 
 Member of the Legislative Assembly (India)

Jodhpur district
Assembly constituencies of Rajasthan